Vatica dulitensis is a tree in the family Dipterocarpaceae, native to Borneo. It is named for Mount Dulit in Sarawak.

Description
The inflorescences bear cream flowers.

Distribution and habitat
Vatica dulitensis is endemic to Borneo. It is sometimes found in lowland mixed dipterocarp forest.

Conservation
Vatica dulitensis has been assessed as near threatened on the IUCN Red List. It is threatened by the conversion of land for agriculture and by the construction of logging roads. The timber is used for flooring and furniture. The species is found in protected areas, especially in Sarawak and Sabah.

References

dulitensis
Endemic flora of Borneo
Plants described in 1934